The military regions (also called war areas) of the National Revolutionary Army were 76 northern military districts and the largest formations of the National Revolutionary Army, under the Military Affairs Commission, chaired by Chiang Kai-shek during the Second Sino-Japanese War and World War II. During the Second Sino-Japanese War the National Revolutionary Army eventually organized itself into twelve Military Regions.

In August 1937 there were:

As the Japanese advanced, three more military regions were formed and the older ones reassigned on 17 January 1938 following the capture of Nanjing.

Following the Battle of Xuzhou and Northern and Eastern Henan 5th Military Region defended Anhui and Hubei north of the Yangtze River.  1st Military Region defended Henan. 3rd Military Region extended itself to defend Anhui south of the Yangtze. 4th Military Region extended its command to the coast of Fujian.

In early July 1938, during the battle of Wuhan the 9th Military Region was activated. It commanded units the 1st and 2nd Army Corps and the Wuhan Garrison, in Jiangxi west of Poyang Lake, southern Hubei and Hunan south of the Yangtze River.

Following the Battle of Wuhan the Chinese army was reorganized along with the military regions.

Additionally there were two special military regions behind Japanese lines:
 Shandong-Jiangsu Military Region - northern Jiangsu and Shandong.
 Hebei-Chahar Military Region - Hebei and Chahar

6th Military Region was reactivated a second time in October 1939, after the first Battle of Changsha.  It commanded forces in Hubei south of the Yangtze and west of the Xiang River. It included forces formerly part of 9th Military Region.

References

Citations

Sources 

 Hsu Long-hsuen and Chang Ming-kai, History of The Sino-Japanese War (1937–1945) 2nd Ed., 1971. Translated by Wen Ha-hsiung, Chung Wu Publishing; 33, 140th Lane, Tung-hwa Street, Taipei, Taiwan Republic of China.

Units and formations of the National Revolutionary Army